Behind the Rainbow is a 2009 documentary film.

Synopsis 
Behind the Rainbow explores the transition of the African National Congress (ANC) from its role as a liberation organization to its position as South Africa's ruling party, by means of the evolution of the relationship between two of its prominent leaders, Thabo Mbeki and Jacob Zuma. Exiled under Apartheid, brothers in arms following Mandela's leadership, they loyally labored to build a non-racial state. Now they are bitter rivals. Their confrontation threatens to tear apart the ANC and the country, meanwhile the poor desperately seek hope in change and the elite fight for the spoils of victory.

Awards 
 Fespaco 2009

External links 

2009 films
Egyptian documentary films
French documentary films
South African documentary films
2009 documentary films
Documentary films about politics
African National Congress
2000s French films